Edward Richardson (1 May 1879 – 16 April 1961) was a British gymnast. He competed in the men's team all-around event at the 1908 Summer Olympics.

References

External links
 

1879 births
1961 deaths
British male artistic gymnasts
Olympic gymnasts of Great Britain
Gymnasts at the 1908 Summer Olympics
Sportspeople from London
20th-century British people